The Bính line (Hán tự: 支丙; chi can also be translated to as branch) was the eleventh dynasty of Hùng kings of the Hồng Bàng period of Văn Lang (now Viet Nam). Starting approximately 1161 B.C., the line refers to the rule of Hưng Đức Lang and his successors.

History
Hưng Đức Lang was born approximately 1211 B.C., and took the regnal name of Hùng Trinh Vương upon becoming Hùng king. The series of all Hùng kings following Hưng Đức Lang took that same regnal name of Hùng Trinh Vương to rule over Văn Lang until approximately 1055 B.C.

Approximately 1100-1000 B.C., as part of the later epoch of the Bronze Age, this period was characterized by the remarkable use of Bronze in tool making and weaponry replacing earlier use of stone. This was a rebirth for the civilization settled in Viet Nam.

References

Bibliography
Nguyễn Khắc Thuần (2008). Thế thứ các triều vua Việt Nam. Giáo Dục Publisher.

Ancient peoples
Hồng Bàng dynasty
11th-century BC disestablishments
12th-century BC establishments